The YMCA Hotel is a historic building in the Tenderloin District of San Francisco, California, United States.

History 
At the time it was inducted into the National Register of Historic Places, it was colloquially referred to as the Whitehall Apartments.

References

National Register of Historic Places in California
Chicago school architecture in California
Hotel buildings completed in 1928
Hotels in San Francisco
YMCA buildings in the United States